Firehouse Tales is an American animated children's television series created by Sidney J. Bailey, produced by Warner Bros. Animation as the only original series for Cartoon Network's now-defunct Tickle-U preschool programming block. The series follows three anthropomorphic fire engines who attend firefighting school.

Characters
 Red (voiced by Jesse Moss) is a red fire engine and the main character in the show who never gives up. He loves nature and the outdoors but most of all, he loves making new friends. Sometimes, he is the leader of the firetruck team. Red has an orange and yellow siren. The episode "New Truck On The Block" reveals his first day in Green Meadows. His catchphrase is, "The sirens say help's on the way!"
 Petrol (voiced by Michael Adamthwaite) is an orange fire engine from Scotland who is sometimes afraid but manages to find the courage inside himself. According to his song "I'm Petrol the Fire Truck", he came before Crabby and Red did. Petrol has two blue sirens.
 Crabby (voiced by Richard Cox) is a grumpy yellow fire engine who sometimes complains about his job and who likes the "great indoors" better than the outdoors but sometimes enjoys the outdoors. Crabby has two red sirens.
 The Chief (voiced by Ron Halder) is the dark blue fire engine who is the leader of the three junior firetrucks (Red, Petrol, and Crabby). He tells them exactly what to do at any given time. He sometimes puts Red in charge of the team and sometimes leads the team whenever an emergency occurs.
 Mayor Precious Primly (voiced by Ellen Kennedy) is the mayor who runs Green Meadows and works for The Chief.
 Stinky Bins (voiced by David "Squatch" Ward) is the green garbage truck of Green Meadows. He is used to his own stench but sometimes takes a bath, resulting in pollution that has to be cleaned up by the firetrucks. He also likes telling jokes, as seen in "Stinky Bubbles".
 Snooty-Tootie (voiced by Colin Murdock) is a black limo who carries the Mayor around Green Meadows. He once taught the junior firetrucks manners.
 Spinner (voiced by David A. Kaye) is an orange helicopter who often doesn't take his job seriously.
 Scoop is a white seaplane who carries water which she can use to douse fires.
 Bubba (voiced by Blu Mankuma) is a yellow bulldozer who works outside the firehouse.
 Milkie (voiced by Cathy Weseluck) is a white ice cream truck who likes to give ice cream to the children.
 Wiser (voiced by French Tickner) is a dark red mobile crane who can lift people from fires. He first appeared in "Older But Wiser". He also narrates all the stories.
 Tug (voiced by Michael Dobson) is a red and yellow fireboat who is ready to rescue.
 Bulky (voiced by Terry Klassen) is a blue blimp who had been decorated for Halloween. He appeared in the episodes "Spinner Spins a Tale" and "Hoppin' Hoses".
 Zoe is a red tow truck who likes helping other cars.
 Lorrie is a light blue Land Rover who lives in the beach and is Petrol's old friend. She first appeared in "The Lorrie Story".
 Newsie is a blue news truck who likes filming. He first appeared in "Trucks on TV".
 Squirt is the firehouse Dalmatian.

Production and background
Firehouse Tales was originally produced by Firehouse Productions, LLC as a 22-minute pilot, created and developed by animation producer Sidney J. Bailey and animation director Clark James. It was sold to Warner Bros. Television in 2004, which following their process, the program was redeveloped as a CG program composited over 2D backgrounds – 26 half hours were subsequently produced by Warner Bros. Animation and aired on Cartoon Network's Tickle-U worldwide.

The original pilot episodes, which never aired publicly, was created as practical miniature sets with computer generated facial expressions added in post production. The original characters cast were: "Pete", "Lakie", "Tip", "Commander", and "Chief McSpeed", while Wiser and Squirt have different designs.

Ancillary products were produced by Bandai (toys) and Scholastic (books).

Broadcast
Firehouse Tales premiered on Cartoon Network's preschool television programming block Tickle-U in the United States on August 22, 2005. It also aired on Cartoonito in the UK from 2006. It has also aired on Star Channel's Starland (formerly Star Toons) block in Greece, RTL Klub in Hungary, RTP2 in Portugal, and more channels in other foreign countries.

References

External links
 

2005 American television series debuts
2006 American television series endings
2000s American animated television series
American children's animated adventure television series
American children's animated comedy television series
American children's animated fantasy television series
American children's animated musical television series
American preschool education television series
Cartoon Network original programming
Cartoonito original programming
English-language television shows
Television series by Warner Bros. Animation
Animated preschool education television series
2000s preschool education television series